Total external reflection is a phenomenon traditionally involving X-rays, but in principle any type of electromagnetic or other wave, closely related to total internal reflection.

Total internal reflection describes the fact that radiation (e.g. visible light) can, at certain angles,  be totally reflected from an interface between two media of different indices of refraction (see Snell's law). Total internal reflection occurs when the first medium has a larger refractive index than the second medium, for example,  light that starts in water and bounces off the water-to-air interface.

Total external reflection is the situation where the light starts in air and vacuum (refractive index 1), and bounces off a material with index of refraction less than 1. For example, in X-rays, the refractive index is frequently slightly less than 1, and therefore total external reflection can happen at a glancing angle. It is called external because the light bounces off the exterior of the material. This makes it possible to focus X-rays.

References

Geometrical optics